Rubus niveus (Mysore raspberry, Ceylon raspberry, hill raspberry;) is a species of Rubus native to southern Asia, from Afghanistan east through India and China to Taiwan and the Philippines, south to Sri Lanka and Malaysia, and north to Gansu in China.

Description
Rubus niveus is a shrub growing to 1–2.5 m tall, the stems whitish tomentose at first, becoming glabrous green to purple later. The leaves are pinnate with 5–11 leaflets (mostly 7 or 9), the leaflets 2.5–8 cm long and 1–4 cm broad, dark green above, densely pale grey to white tomentose beneath. The flowers are about 1 cm diameter, with five dark pink to red petals. The fruit is 8–12 mm diameter, densely grey tomentose, dark red at first, ripening black.

Cultivation
Rubus niveus is cultivated for its edible fruit. It has become naturalised and invasive in Hawaii and the Galápagos Islands.

References

niveus
Flora of Asia
Plants described in 1813
Berries